Tày Tấc (Tai Tâk) is a Southwestern Tai language spoken in Mường Tấc District (Muang Tâk), eastern Sơn La Province, Vietnam, where it is also referred to as White Tay.

References

Works cited

 

Southwestern Tai languages
Languages of Vietnam